The Ruf CTR Anniversary is high performance sports car manufactured by German automobile manufacturer Ruf Automobile. The vehicle made its debut at the 87th Geneva Motor Show in March 2017, exactly 30 years after the original Ruf CTR was introduced, and is built to pay homage to that model.

History 
Although the CTR Anniversary is similar in appearance to the Porsche 911, it is not actually based on a 911 body. The CTR Anniversary's chassis and body were designed and engineered by Vela Performance, in Berlin, Germany. The car is assembled in the Ruf headquarters in Pfaffenhausen, Germany. A monocoque made of carbon fiber reinforced plastic with a screwed-on subframe made of tubular steel and light metal serves as the basis, while the body, which is styled after the Porsche 964, is made of a carbon fiber laminate. The chassis consists of an in-house designed suspension using double wishbones and push rod actuated inboard springs & dampers. Power is sent to the rear wheels through a 7-speed manual gearbox and locking differential. The car also sports retro components based on the original CTR such as the 'whale tail' rear wing five-spoke wheels, interior and the steering wheel. The CTR Anniversary is priced at €892,500 and only 50 examples are set to be produced. They have been produced in Pfaffenhausen since 2019.

References

External links 

Coupés
Rear-wheel-drive vehicles
CTR Anniversary
Rear-engined vehicles
Cars powered by boxer engines
Cars introduced in 2017